Max Mollar (29 August 1929 – 17 August 1977) was  a former Australian rules footballer who played with St Kilda in the Victorian Football League (VFL).

Notes

External links 		
		
		
		
		
		
		
		
1929 births		
1977 deaths		
Australian rules footballers from Victoria (Australia)		
St Kilda Football Club players